Immortal X-Men is an American superhero comic book series written by Kieron Gillen and published by Marvel Comics.

Publication history
Writer-editor Jonathan Hickman and artist/co-plotter Pepe Larraz created the Quiet Council of Krakoa in House of X #6 (October, 2019). The Council appeared in many comics in the Dawn of X and Reign of X relaunches, creating and enforcing the laws of Krakoa and prosecuting and delivering judgement on mutants accused of breaking those laws.
 
In March 2022, the council got their own comic book as Immortal X-Men as part of the Destiny of X relaunch. It was written  by Kieron Gillen and drawn by Lucas Werneck, building plot points for their upcoming event Sins of Sinister. After briefly transformed into the Immoral X-Men limited series, Gillen and Wernck will continue their next story plans for the Immortal X-Men.

Plot

After the events of Inferno, Magneto stepped down from the Quiet Council of Krakoa. The Quiet Council searched for replacement candidates, including the Black Priestess and Hope Summers. After considerable deliberation, Hope Summers took over Magneto’s seat on the Council’s so that she could represent the interests of the Five, the mutants involved in Krakoa’s resurrection process. Black Priestess was outvoted by Hope created a giant monster. The Council successfully managed to kill Black Priestess, defeating the monster.

Destiny informed the Council about upcoming conflict between the Avengers, X-Men, and Eternals. While White Queen informed them about Doctor Statis, Mister Sinister's clone claiming to be the real Sinister, causing Mister Sinister to flee only to be captured briefly by Eternals. Only Destiny and Mystique were aware of three other clones of him.

During the events of A.X.E.: Judgment Day, the secret of mutant resurrection went public and as expected the Eternals launched an attack on Krakoa. Eternals were eventually retreated from battle by Progenitor, who addressed that people of Earth will be judged. Only Red Queen and Exodus are judged positively while others were not judged or received receive negative judgment. As this crisis led to the creation of a destructive artificial Celestial called the Progenitor, members of the Quiet Council fought alongside the Avengers, X-Men, Eternals and even Orchis convinced by Nightcrawler.

Mister Sinister cloned Moira and used her resetting powers to manipulate events to his liking. He killed and corrupted several members of the Council including Professor X, White Queen, Hope, Exodus by implanting his personality in them during the resurrection process and used it to take over the world. He was exiled to the Pit.

Team roster
 Bold indicates current members of the Quiet Council as of 2023.

Reception
In 2022, Immortal X-Men won the IGN's Best Comic Book Series or Original Graphic Novel as well as Dragon Awards for Best Comic Book.

In 2023, CBR.com ranked Immortal X-Men 2nd in their "Top 100 Comics of 2022" list. It was also nominated for the GLAAD Media Award for Outstanding Comic Book at the 34th GLAAD Media Awards.

According to review aggregation website Comic Book Roundup, Immortal X-Men received an average rating of 8.8 out of 10 based on 88 critics on review.

Collected editions

Trivia
 Potential candidates of the Quiet Council:
 Abigail Brand
 Angel (Warren Worthington)
 Beast (Henry McCoy)
 Black Bishop (Shinobi Shaw)
 Black Priestess (Selene Gallio)
 Cyclops (Scott Summers)
 Cypher (Douglas Ramsey)
 Gorgon (Tomi Shishido)
 Legion (David Haller)
 Lodus Logos
 Namor
 Penance (Monet St. Croix)
 Sobunar of the Depths
 Vulcan (Gabriel Summers)
 Xilo, the First Defender

References

Comics
Series of books